Space Power (SPTV) (Arabic: سبيس باور) was an Arabian TV channel featuring anime programs targeted at the youth audience. Based in Damascus, Syria, the channel began broadcasting on 8 March 2008 with content from the Al Zuhra Company in Syria, Network Today in Damascus and Dubai. In 2014, Space Power closed down.

However, on November 16, 2016, Space Power returned as a programming block in the Spacetoon channel starting from 10:30 pm Mecca time until midnight and displaying all the dubbing works in its favor with the exchange of logos between Space Power and Spacetoon every 10 seconds.

In 2019, some of the Space Power programs were added to the Spacetoon Go app.

And in 2019, a new program called Magic Kaito was added to the Space Power menu in the Spacetoon Go app, making it the first program for Space Power after closing the channel.

Programs 
Fist of the North Star (2008; Anime)
Magic Kaito (2019–2020; Anime) (Exclusive to Spacetoon Go)
Megalo Box (2020; Anime)  (Exclusive to Spacetoon Go)
Naruto (2007–2011; Anime)
One Piece (2008–2010; Anime)
Detective Conan (2008–2011; Anime)
Peacemaker Kurogane (Anime)
InuYasha (Anime)
Basilisk (Anime)
Shura no Toki (Anime)
SoltyRei (Anime)
Gankutsuou: The Count of Monte Cristo (Anime)
Sakura Wars (Anime)
Black Cat (Anime)
Hero Tales 
The Sword and the Chess of Death
Last Exile (Anime)
Mummies Alive! (2009; Anime)
Glass Fleet (Anime)
Gad Guard (Anime)
Samurai 7 (Anime)
Zaion: I Wish You Were Here (Anime)
Fushigi Yûgi (2010; Anime)
Flame Of Recca (2010; Anime)
Sherlock Holmes in the 22nd Century (cartoon)
Iria: Zeiram the Animation (Anime)
Phi Brain: Puzzle of God (Anime)
Ascendance of a Bookworm (Anime)
Bleach (2012–2013; Anime) (in Japanese audio with Arabic subtitles)
Gintama (2012–2013; Anime) (in Japanese audio with Arabic subtitles)
Detective Conan: The Time-Bombed Skyscraper (2008; Movies)
Detective Conan: The Fourteenth Target (2011; Movies)
Detective Conan: The Last Wizard of the Century (2011; Movies)
Detective Conan: Captured in Her Eyes (2013; Movies)
Shaolin Soccer (2008; Movies) (in English audio with Arabic subtitles)
Mr. Nice Guy (1997 film) (2010; Movies) (in English audio with Arabic subtitles)
Mythbusters (Entertainment) (in English audio with Arabic subtitles)
Armor Hero'' (2010; Drama)
Prison Break (2010; Drama) (in English audio with Arabic subtitles)
24 (Drama) (in English audio with Arabic subtitles)
The X-Files season 8 (Drama) (in English audio with Arabic subtitles)
Star Trek: Enterprise (Drama) (in English audio with Arabic subtitles)
Bawang Merah Bawang Putih (Drama)
Prank Patrol (Entertainment) (in English audio with Arabic subtitles)
Drift (Movies) (in Japanese audio with Arabic subtitles)
GP Racing (Sports)
Dragon Ball Super (2022; Anime)
Hetty Feather (2021; Drama)
My Hero Academia (2022; Anime)
Laughing Under the Clouds (2022; Anime)
Made in Abyss (2021; Anime)
Girls' Last Tour (2020; Anime)
Poco's Udon World (2021; Anime)
Game Power (2008; Science & Tech)
Game On (2022; Science & Tech)

See also 
Spacetoon
Spacetoon English

External links 

 

Mass media companies of the United Arab Emirates
Arabic-language television stations
Defunct television channels
Television channels and stations established in 2007
Television channels and stations established in 2008
Television channels and stations disestablished in 2014
2008 establishments in the United Arab Emirates
2014 disestablishments in the United Arab Emirates
Companies based in Damascus
Spacetoon